Lick Branch is a stream in St. Francois County in the U.S. state of Missouri. It is a tributary of Wolf Creek.

Lick Branch was so named on account of a mineral lick near its course.

See also
List of rivers of Missouri

References

Rivers of St. Francois County, Missouri
Rivers of Missouri